is a female Japanese singer from Saitama Prefecture. She is signed to Lantis, a label which contribute songs to anime and video games.

Discography

Singles 
 Koko ni Iru kara... (Released August 25, 2004)
 Koko ni Iru kara... — anime television series Girls Bravo first season ending theme
 FOREVER

 and then, (Released March 2, 2005)
 and then, — anime television series Girls Bravo second season ending theme
 Nakigao Nochi Hare

 innocence (Released August 24, 2005)
 innocence — anime television series Shuffle! ending theme
 Time has come

 Be Ambitious, Guys! (Released September 7, 2005)
 Be Ambitious, Guys! — PC game Tick! Tack! opening theme
 Pieces — PC game Tick! Tack! insert song

 Faze to love (Released November 2, 2005)
 Faze to love — anime television series Gunparade Orchestra opening theme
 Arigato!

 screaming (Released April 26, 2006)
 screaming — anime television series Soul Link opening theme
 dust trail — anime television series Soul Link ending theme

 Cosmic Rhapsody (Released July 5, 2006)
 Cosmic Rhapsody — PS2 game Soul Link Extension opening theme
 Anata o Mamoritai — PS2 game Soul Link Extension opening theme

 Nijiiro Sentimental (Released October 25, 2006)
 Nijiiro Sentimental — anime television series Gift ~eternal rainbow~ opening theme
 Amayaka na Atashi

 Bimetsu S.O.S!! (Released April 25, 2007)
 Binetsu S.O.S!! — anime television series Idolmaster: Xenoglossia opening theme
 Moonlight Labyrinth — anime television series Idolmaster: Xenoglossia insert song

 Star☆drops (Released September 5, 2007)
 Star☆drops — PC game Hoshiful ~Seitou Gakuen Tenmon Doukoukai~ opening theme
 Hoshi ni Negai o ~When you wish upon Star☆drops~ — PC game Hoshiful ~Seitou Gakuen Tenmon Doukoukai~ image song

 Hizamazuku made 5-byou Dake! (Released January 23, 2008)
 Hizamazuku made 5-byou Dake! — anime television series Kimi ga Aruji de Shitsuji ga Ore de opening theme
 Sha-la-la

 Sky Sanctuary (Released July 23, 2008)
 Sky Sanctuary — Visual novel Oretachi ni Tsubasa wa Nai ~Prelude~ opening theme
 change of heart

 Hatsukoi Parachute (Released October 22, 2008)
 Hatsukoi Parachute — anime television series Akaneiro ni Somaru Saka opening theme
 sweet sweet time

 Glossy:MMM (Released April 22, 2009)
 Glossy:MMM — anime television series Saki opening theme
 The room vacation

 Princess Primp! (Released July 22, 2009)
 Princess Primp! — anime television series Princess Lover! opening theme
 Inochi Mijikashi, Koiseyo Hime!

 Nudity (Released March 24, 2010)
 Prism Celebration (Released April 7, 2010)
 Tropical Future (Released August 11, 2010)
 Future ∞ (Released October 27, 2010)
 Neverland (Released May 11, 2011)
 Neverland - anime television series Oretachi ni Tsubasa wa Nai ending theme

Albums 
 Lovey-dovey (Released June 28, 2006)
 Faze to love
 Koko ni Iru kara...
 LINK — PC game Shiritsu Akihabara Gakuen ending theme
 Love, Fate, Love — anime television series Final Approach ending theme
 Cheer Up! — PC game Home maid opening theme
 and then,
 innocence - anime television series Shuffle! ending theme
 Akiiro — PC game Akiiro Renka opening theme
 AM1:00 — PC game White Princess ending theme
 Be Ambitious, Guys!
 Anata e

 Prismatic colors (Released June 27, 2007)
 Nijiiro Sentimental
 Screaming - anime television series Soul Link opening theme
 Especially — PC game D.C. II ~Da Capo II~ insert song
 Peppermint — OVA Ichigo 100% ending theme
 Astraea — PC game Muv-Luv (all-age version) Kei Ayamine ending theme
 little wish — anime television series Shuffle! Memories image song
 Taiyou ni Te o Nobase — PS2 game Gunparade Orchestra Midori no Shou ~Ookami to Ka no Shōnen~ opening theme
 Prismatic colors
 Growth — PC game Akiiro Ouka opening theme
 Ageless Love — PC game Really? Really! insert song
 Binetsu S.O.S!! ~solitude Ver.
 Aozora no Mieru Oka de — PC game Aozora no Mieru Oka opening theme
 Eien ni Saku Hana — PC game Miharu ~Alto Another Story~ ending theme

 Secret masterpieces (Released December 19, 2007, distributed through iTunes Store Japan)
 Confession — PC game Majipuri -Wonder Cradle- opening theme
 Hikarikaze — PS2 game Final Approach ending theme
 L — PC game Alto opening theme
 Anata o Mamoritai
 dust trail - anime television series Soul Link ending theme
 Love Song — PC game Primitive Link ending theme
 Sakamichi — PC game Aozora no Mieru Oka ending theme
 FOREVER
 Tsuioku, Soshite Yokan — PC game Homemaid insert song
 My Story — PS2&DC game Suigetsu ~Mayoigokoro~ ending theme
 Nijiiro Sentimental (bossanova version)

 Brilliant Moment (Released August 6, 2008)
 TIME — PC game Ashita no Kimi to Au tame ni opening theme
 Hizamazuku made 5-byou dake!
 Princess Lover! — PC game Princess Lover! opening theme
 to the sky — PC game MagusTale ~Sekaijuu to Koisuru Mahou Tsukai~ opening theme
 Himitsu Recipe — PC game Sakura Strasse opening theme
 Ai no Kakera — anime television series School Days ending theme
 Setsunasa no Gradation — PC game Akaneiro ni Somaru Saka opening theme
 True fairy tale from happy princess — PC game Happy Princess opening theme
 FairlyLife — PC game FairlyLife theme song
 Akane no Saka — PS2 game Akaneiro ni Somaru Saka: Parallel opening theme
 natural tone — anime television series Shuffle! Memories episode12 ending theme
 Star☆drops
 Binetsu S.O.S!!
 Brilliant Moment
 two of us — PC game Happy Princess ending theme

 Double Flower (Released September 25, 2009)
 Hatsukoi Parachute
 to be continued — PC game Happy Princess ~Another Fairytale~ theme song
 ever — PC game Ashita no Shitsumi to Au tame ni opening theme
 Glossy:MMM — anime television series Saki opening theme
 Here To Stay — PS2 game Akaneiro ni Somaru Saka: Parallel ending theme
 Pieces
 Sky Sanctuary
 Fortune's wheel — PC game Homemaid ~Sweets~ ending theme
 glorious days — PC game Sakuranbo Strasse opening theme
 Koizakura — PC game Haruiro Ouse opening theme
 Todoke, Kono Omoi — PC game Princess Lover! ending theme
 Voice
 Princess Primp!

 espressivo (Released November 24, 2010)
 Symphonic Love - PC game Mashiro-iro Symphony theme song
 Ishin Denshin ~Itsuka Kitto, Dakara Kitto~ - PC game Natsuiro Penguin opening theme
 se.Kirara - PC game Se-kirara opening theme
 Prism Celebration - PSP game Marriage Royale: Prism Story opening theme
 Eternal Recurrence - PC game Hoshizora no Memoria opening theme
 White Crystal - PC game Memoria theme song
 Waltz! Waltz! Waltz! (Clear Sound Ver.) - PS2 game Princess Lover! Eternal Love For My Lady first print limited edition special insert song
 Mirai Kaikisen - anime television series Shukufuku no Campanella ending theme
 Shiawase Houteishiki - PC game Neko☆Koi! ~Nekogami-sama to Nekomimi no Tatari~ ending theme
 Natsu Kashiki Kioku - PC game Natsu ni Kanaderu Bokura no Uta theme song
 Espressivo
 Silhouette - PC game Oretachi ni Tsubasa ha nai drama CD 2nd season vol.4 image song
 Koi no Roller Coaster - PC game Da Capo II Fall in Love opening theme

References

External links 
  
 Miyuki Hashimoto at Oricon 

1980 births
Living people
Musicians from Saitama Prefecture
Anime musicians
21st-century Japanese singers
21st-century Japanese women singers